Gerardo de León, ONA (September 12, 1913 – July 25, 1981), was a Filipino film director and actor.

Biography
De León, who was born Gerardo Ilagan, was a member of the Ilagan clan of Philippine motion pictures, which includes Robert Arevalo, Conrado Conde, Angel Esmeralda, Eddie Ilagan, musical scorer Tito Arévalo, and his daughter Liberty Ilagan. De León was a medical doctor by profession, but his ultimate love for film won him over. He made his acting debut in the 1934 film Ang Dangal. He acted in eight other films before becoming a director. The first film he directed was Bahay-Kubo (1939), starring Fely Vallejo, an actress whom he later married.

De Leon produced a number of anti-American propaganda films during World War Two, in collaboration with the occupying Japanese forces and Japanese director Abe Yutaka, who personally chose De Leon for the projects. De Leon was arrested and charged with treason after the Japanese were defeated, and was almost executed by the Filipino government. But at the last minute, he was pardoned when evidence came to light that all during the war, he had secretly assisted the Filipino resistance as well.

Nicknamed "Manong", de León is the most awarded film director in the history of the Filipino Academy of Movie Arts and Sciences' FAMAS Awards. From 1952 to 1971, he was awarded seven FAMAS Awards, three of them received consecutively. His 1961 film The Moises Padilla Story was selected as the Philippine entry for the Best Foreign Language Film at the 32nd Academy Awards, but was not accepted as a nominee.

All of the films for which he won Best Director also won Best Picture at the FAMAS, namely Sawa sa Lumang Simboryo (1952), Hanggang sa Dulo ng Daigdig (1958), Huwag Mo Akong Limutin (1960), Noli Me Tangere (1961, adapted from the novel of the same title), El Filibusterismo (1962), Daigdig ng Mga Api (1965), and Lilet (1971). One of his unfinished projects was Juan de la Cruz (1972) with Fernando Poe Jr.

He is known to fans of cult horror films for the handful of 1960s horror movies he directed, some co-directed with his friend Eddie Romero and co-financed with American money. These films included Terror Is a Man (1959), The Blood Drinkers/ Blood Is the Color of Night (1964), Curse of the Vampires/ Whisper to the Wind (1966), Brides of Blood (1968), and Mad Doctor of Blood Island (1969). Roger Corman hired him in 1971 to direct his gritty Women in Prison film Women in Cages (1971), featuring Pam Grier as a sadistic prison warden  and Philippines sex symbol Sofia Moran. De Leon died on July 25, 1981, at age 67.

Filmography (director)
Estrellita (1940)
Ang Maestra (1941)
Dawn of Freedom (1943)Mameng, iniibig kita (1947)48 Oras (1950)Sisa (1951)Diego Silang (1951)Bagong Umaga (1952)Python at the Old Dome (Sawa sa lumang simboryo) (1952)Pedro Penduko (1954)Ifuago (1954)Sanda Wong (1955)Saigon (1956)Bakya mo Neneng (1957)Kamay ni Cain/ The Hands of Cain (1957)Hanggang sa dulo ng daigdig (1958)Terror Is a Man (1959) aka Blood CreatureHuwag mo akong limutin/ Don't Let Me Forget (1960)Noli me tangere (Touch Me Not) (1960)The Moises Padilla Story (1961)Noli me tangere (1961)El Filibusterismo (1962)I Am Justice (Ako ang katarungan) (1962)The Walls of Hell (Intramuros) (1964)Ang Daigdig ng mga api/ World of the Oppressed (1965)The Blood Drinkers (1964) a.k.a. Kulay dugo ang gabi/ Blood is the Color of Night; aka The Vampire People.Curse of the Vampires (Dugo ng vampira) (1966) a.k.a. Ibulong mo sa hangin (Whisper to the Wind), a.k.a. Creatures of EvilBrides of Blood (co-dir. with Eddie Romero, 1968)The Mad Doctor of Blood Island (co-dir. with Eddie Romero, 1969) aka Tomb of the Living DeadLilet (1971)Women in Cages (1971)Fe, Esperanza, Caridad (1975) (translation: Faith, Hope and Charity) Banaue: Stairway to the Sky (1975)Juan dela Cruz'' (unfinished)

References

External links

1913 births
1981 deaths
20th-century Filipino male actors
Filipino collaborators with Imperial Japan
Burials at the Libingan ng mga Bayani
Filipino film directors
Filipino male film actors